The President of Peking University is the chief administrator of Peking University, a major public academic institution of higher learning, located in Beijing, capital of the People's Republic of China. Each is appointed by and is responsible to the Central Committee of the Chinese Communist Party and the State Council, who delegate to him or her the day-to-day running of the university. The current president is Gong Qihuang, in office since June 2022.

Presidents of Peking University

Communist Party Secretaries of Peking University

References

External links
 

Presidents of Peking University
Peking University